Severny District is the name of several administrative and municipal districts in Russia. The name literally means "northern".

Economic regions 
 Northern economic region (Severny ekonomichesky rayon), an economic region

Districts of the federal subjects 
 Severny District, Moscow, a district in North-Eastern Administrative Okrug of Moscow
 Severny District, Novosibirsk Oblast, an administrative and municipal district of Novosibirsk Oblast
 Severny District, Orenburg Oblast, an administrative and municipal district of Orenburg Oblast

City divisions 
 Severny City District, Oryol, a city district of Oryol, the administrative center of Oryol Oblast
 Severny Territorial Okrug, a territorial okrug of the city of Arkhangelsk, the administrative center of Arkhangelsk Oblast

See also 
 Severny (disambiguation)
 Severny Okrug (disambiguation)

References